The 1937 All-Ireland Minor Football Championship was the ninth staging of the All-Ireland Minor Football Championship, the Gaelic Athletic Association's premier inter-county Gaelic football tournament for boys under the age of 18.

Louth entered the championship as defending champions, however, they were defeated in the Leinster Championship.

Cavan won the championship following a 1-11 to 1-5 defeat of Wexford in the All-Ireland final. This was their first All-Ireland title.

Results

Connacht Minor Football Championship

Leinster Minor Football Championship

Munster Minor Football Championship

Ulster Minor Football Championship

All-Ireland Minor Football Championship
Semi-Finals

Final

References

1937
All-Ireland Minor Football Championship